Maxwell McCandless Unger (born April 14, 1986) is a former American football center who played in the National Football League for 10 seasons. He played college football at Oregon and was drafted by the Seattle Seahawks in the second round of the 2009 NFL Draft. Unger was the starting center for the Seahawks in Super Bowl XLVIII.

Early years
Unger was born in Kailua-Kona, Hawaii.  He attended Hawaii Preparatory Academy in Kamuela, Hawaii, where he was a 2002 second-team all-state offensive honoree.

Regarded as a three-star recruit by Rivals.com, Unger was listed as the No. 45 offensive guard. He chose to attend Oregon over Oregon State.

Unger's grandfather, Tom E. Unger, wrote a book about his grandfather, Maximillian Joseph August Schlemmer, titled Max Schlemmer, Hawaii's King of Laysan Island.

College career
Unger enrolled in the University of Oregon, where he played for the Oregon Ducks football team from 2005 to 2008.  While playing for the Ducks, Unger was twice named as a first-team All-Pac-10 selection, and also receiving honorable mention and second-team All-Pac-10 honors.  He was a first-team All-American in 2008 in recognition of his successful season.  Unger started on the offensive line in all of his four years with the Ducks.

Professional career

2009 NFL Draft
Projected to be second round selection, Unger was listed as the No. 1 offensive guard available in the 2009 NFL Draft. He was described as "not a great prospect," yet having "starting potential on the NFL level for years to come." Unger was drafted by the Seahawks in the second round with the 49th overall pick. He was the highest selected Oregon Ducks offensive lineman since Tom Drougas went 22nd overall in 1972.

Seattle Seahawks

Unger signed a 4-year contract with the Seahawks worth over $3 million on July 29, 2009. After a pre-season effort in which head coach Jim Mora said "We believe he is ready to start and be a productive player in this league immediately," Unger was named starting right guard over Mansfield Wrotto. In 2012, Unger signed a four-year extension worth a maximum of $24 million making him one of the top 5 paid centers in the NFL. He was one of only three members to remain on the Seahawks from before John Schneider's arrival in Seattle in January 2010, along with Brandon Mebane and Jon Ryan.  Unger won his first Super Bowl title with the Seattle Seahawks in Super Bowl XLVIII, beating the Denver Broncos by a score of 43–8. In 2013, he also made his second Pro Bowl team. In 2014, the Seahawks finished the season with a 12–4 record and made it back to the Super Bowl. The Seahawks failed to repeat as Super Bowl champions after they lost 28–24 to the New England Patriots in Super Bowl XLIX.

New Orleans Saints
On March 10, 2015, Unger, along with the Seahawks' first round selection in the 2015 NFL Draft, were traded to the New Orleans Saints in exchange for tight end Jimmy Graham.

On May 8, 2017, it was reported that Unger suffered a foot injury and was expected to be out for five months and start the 2017 season on the PUP list. However the foot healed quicker than expected and was the Saints starting center for the entire 2017 season, starting all 16 games.

Unger was named to his first Pro Bowl with the Saints and his third overall in 2018.

Retirement
On March 16, 2019, Unger announced his retirement from the NFL after ten seasons.

References

External links

 New Orleans Saints bio
 Seattle Seahawks bio
 Oregon Ducks bio

1986 births
Living people
People from Hawaii (island)
Players of American football from Hawaii
Sportspeople from Hawaii
American football offensive tackles
American football centers
Oregon Ducks football players
Seattle Seahawks players
New Orleans Saints players
National Conference Pro Bowl players
Unconferenced Pro Bowl players